is a railway station in Nōgata, Fukuoka.

Lines 
 Chikuhō Electric Railroad
 Chikuhō Electric Railroad Line

Platforms

Adjacent stations

Surrounding area
 Japan National Route 200
 Nōgatakanda Post Office
 Ongano Nursery
 Lumiere Nōgata
 TRIAL Nōgata
 7-Eleven

Railway stations in Fukuoka Prefecture
Railway stations in Japan opened in 1959